Kazatskoye is a rural locality (a selo) and the administrative center of the Kazatskoye Rural Settlement, Yakovlevsky District, Belgorod Oblast, Russia. The population was 595 as of 2010. There are 15 streets.

Geography 
Kazatskoye is located 28 km southwest of Stroitel (the district's administrative centre) by road. Krasnoye Podgoroneye is the nearest rural locality.

References 

Rural localities in Yakovlevsky District, Belgorod Oblast